Break Point is an Indian documentary series of ZEE5 OTT platform directed by Nitesh Tiwari and Ashwiny Iyer Tiwari under their production company, Earthsky Pictures. A series based on the former Indian doubles tennis players partnership and success of Mahesh Bhupathi and Leander Paes.

Plot 

It is a story of ambition, hard work, belief, friendship, brotherhood and partnership of the former Indian tennis players

Cast 

 Leander Paes as himself
 Mahesh Bhupathi as himself.

Production 
Nitesh Tiwari filmed interviews separately with Paes and Bhupathi and with both men at the same time. He used this footage in this documentary. He also did interviews with some Indian tennis players and International double partners of Paes, Bhupathi. He used archive footages. They use news headlines of media to expand drama. He filmed interviews of Paes and Bhupathi's family members. Tiwari used short interviews of Sania Mirza and Amitabh Bachchan.

Releases 
ZEE5 released the web series on 1 October 2021. Its trailer was launched on 17 September 2021.

The web series will be presented in 'Master classes' organised by ZEE5 at 52nd International Film Festival of India to be held from 20 November to 28 November.

Episodes

Reception

Critical reviews 
Vivek M V of Deccan Herald gave the show 4/5 stars, stating that the Lee-Hesh story was compelling and a shocking confession. He stated that the determination in their love, indifference and hatred towards each other makes ‘Break Point’ binge-worthy. By talking to the players’ friends and family, the documentary gets very close to the truth. Vivek complained that the best and worst moments of their partnership of Davis Cup journey was given little attention.

Subhash K Jha of IWMBuzz.com rated it 3/5, stating that it is an interesting documentary web series. Jha stated that Bhupathi gave a more superficial description of their difficulties, while Paes showed more hurt at their split than Bhupathi.

Latestly rated the documentary 3/5 stars, stating that it is a perfectly balanced love story with a dramatised breakup, with fantastic execution, moving like a love story with a perfectly balanced narrative. On the other hand, it has unexplained sequences and a little more drama. Overall, they stated it is a remarkable attempt to answer the oft-asked question "What went wrong between India's tennis aces Leander Paes and Mahesh Bhupathi?'"

References

External links 

 Break Point on ZEE5
 

2021 web series debuts
Indian web series
Tennis mass media
ZEE5 original programming